HD 132563 is a triple star system in the constellation Boötes. The two resolvable components of this system are designated HD 132563 AC and HD 132563 B. The primary star, HD 132563 AC, is actually a spectroscopic binary with a period of more than 15 years and an orbital eccentricity of greater than 0.65. The smaller member of this tightly orbiting pair has about 55% the mass of the Sun.

Planetary system
Based upon radial velocity variations of HD 132563B, the presence of an ordinary giant planet has been inferred by S. Desidera et al. (2011). This object is orbiting the star with a period of 1,544 days, at a distance of about 2.6 AU, and with an orbital eccentricity of 0.22.

References

External links
 

Boötes
132563
Triple star systems
Planetary systems with one confirmed planet
F-type main-sequence stars
G-type main-sequence stars
073261
Durchmusterung objects